Heavy Metal Thunder is a greatest hits album by heavy metal band Saxon, released in 2002. The album features eight re-recorded tracks, which first appeared on the limited edition of Killing Ground, as well as five other tracks. All of these tracks originally appeared on their first six albums, from their self-titled debut to Crusader.

A limited edition bonus disc, featuring five live tracks from a 2002 show in San Antonio, Texas, as well as the music video for Killing Ground recorded during Wacken Open Air 2001.

Track listing

The album was re-issued on 14 February 2015 by UDR. Disc one is identical to the original release. All tracks from Disc two were recorded live at the Bloodstock Heavy Metal Festival on 10 August 2014.

Personnel
 Biff Byford – vocals
 Paul Quinn – guitar
 Doug Scarratt – guitar
 Nibbs Carter – bass
 Fritz Randow – drums

Production
 Biff Byford – producer
 Saxon – producer
 Karo Studios, Brackel, Germany – recording and mixing location
 Nikolo Kotzev – audio engineered 
 Charlie Bauerfeind – audio engineered 
 Rainer Hansel – executive producer, mixing
 Herman Frank – mixing
 Rainer Holst – mastering at Staccato Studios Hannover, Germany
 Paul R. Gregory – cover design

References

Saxon (band) compilation albums
2002 compilation albums
SPV/Steamhammer compilation albums